Frank Knowles (May 1891 – 20 January 1951) was an English footballer. His regular position was at full back. He was born in Hyde, Cheshire. He played for Manchester United, Arsenal (as a guest during World War I), Stalybridge Celtic, Hyde Park, Oldham Athletic, Sandbach Ramblers, Hartlepool United, and Manchester City.

External links
MUFCInfo.com profile

1891 births
1951 deaths
English footballers
Manchester United F.C. players
Oldham Athletic A.F.C. players
Arsenal F.C. wartime guest players
Manchester City F.C. players
Hartlepool United F.C. players
People from Hyde, Greater Manchester
Sandbach Ramblers F.C. players
Association football fullbacks
Stalybridge Celtic F.C. players